Nocturnes is the second studio album from Uh Huh Her, which was released on October 11, 2011 worldwide. The album had four singles and music videos, "Another Case", "Disdain", "Wake To Sleep" and most recently, "Human Nature".

Background and live performances
In September 2011, the band announced the release of the album for October 11. On September 15, the band broadcast a trailer of the album, which featured two songs - "Another Case" and "Same High".

The album is produced by and features Wendy Melvoin of Wendy & Lisa.

On January 9, the band was invited on Jimmy Kimmel's show to perform the songs "Marstorm" and "Disdain". The video gained 12,000 views in three days.

Meanwhile, a Nocturnes tour was planned all over America and in Europe in countries such as U.K, Netherlands, known as the Keep A Breast Tour to raise awareness, going from March 2011 to May 2012 with over 40 dates.

Camila Grey, the band's singer, states that the album's title refers to night and darkness, while Leisha Hailey explains that it's about things you work out when you're asleep.

Release 
Unlike Common Reaction, Nocturnes was written without the help of a manager and producer, with funds being raised money for the album by selling goodies, painting, and finally recorded the album "with no pressure" as Hailey says.

The release of Nocturnes was kicked off with a music video for the song Another Case.  Music videos were also released for Wake To Sleep, Debris, and Human Nature.

Media use 
The song "Same High" appears on the soundtrack of the comedy-drama film The Kids Are All Right and the song "Time Stand Still" appears on the soundtrack of the TV show The Secret Circle.

Track listing
"Marstorm" - 4:02
"Another Case" - 3:24
"Disdain" - 2:48
"Wake To Sleep" - 4:09
"Human Nature" - 4:28
"Many Colors" - 2:27
"Debris" - 2:45
"Criminal" - 4:13
"Same High" - 3:57
"Darkness Is" - 3:34
"Time Stands Still" - 4:11

The Nocturnes Tour Dates

The Nocturnes European Tour Dates

References

Uh Huh Her (band) albums
2011 albums